Marko Savić may refer to:
 Marko Savić (pianist) (1941–2013), Serbian pianist and university professor
 Marko Savić (footballer) (born 1984), Serbian footballer
 Marko Savić (water polo) (born 1981), German water polo player
 Marko Savić (basketball) (born 1988), Serbian basketball player